A Tjasker is a type of small drainage windmill used in the Netherlands. There are four tjaskers remaining in Drenthe.

Locations

Grolloo

The Paaltjasker at Grolloo was erected in June 1985. It was built in 1930 in the Dongelsveen, probably by Roelof Dijksma. The tjasker was dismantled in 1940. It now stands beside a cycle path in the Grollooërveen.

Nijeveen
This paaltjasker stands at Kolderveense Bovenboer, just outside Nijeveen.

Zeijen
Tjasker Bollenveen
The paaltjasker Bollenveen was built at Zeijen by volunteers in 2001 under the leadership of Waling Hofkamp. It was built near the former site of another tjasker. It is owned by the Molenstichting Drenthe (English: Drenthe Mills Society).

Tjasker Meestersveen

The paaltjasker Meesterveen formerly stood at Amen where it was erected before 1940. It was discovered in the 1980s in a farmer's shed. It was erected at Zeijen in 1983 as part of a project for the unemployed. The tjasker is owned by the Molenstichting Drenthe. The tjasker is listed as a Rijksmonument, number 413729. Photographs taken in early 2009 show that the sails have been removed.

Dutch Wikipedia articles
Tjasker Grolloo
Tjasker Bollenveen
Tjasker Meestersveen

References

Windmills in Drenthe
Rijksmonuments in Drenthe